The Wisconsin Maritime Museum is a maritime museum in the Lake Michigan port and shipbuilding city of Manitowoc, Wisconsin, U.S.. It preserves and teaches about the maritime history of the Great Lakes and Wisconsin.

History 
The museum was founded in 1969 as the Manitowoc Submarine Memorial Association. The USS Cobia arrived in Manitowoc and was initially restored in 1970, and in 1986 became part of the museum as well as becoming a National Historic Landmark and joining the National Register of Historic Places. The submarine has been restored and has one of the oldest operational radar systems in the world.

The Cobia was dry docked in 1996, and in 2022 the museum received a $500,000 grant to dry dock the Cobia again for regular maintenance and repairs.

Exhibits 
The museum offers guided tours of the Cobia as well as overnight stays on the submarine. In addition to the Cobia, the museum displays the 65-ton Chief Wawatam steam engine and exhibits on shipbuilding and shipwrecks in Wisconsin, a model ship gallery, children's play exhibits and a temporary exhibit gallery.

See also 

 Door County Maritime Museum, a group of maritime museums located within Door County

References

External links 
 Wisconsin Maritime Museum website

Museums established in 1968
Maritime museums in Wisconsin
Museums in Manitowoc County, Wisconsin
Museums of the Great Lakes